Frederick Larmour Munce, MBE (b 1948) is  an eminent Irish Methodist who over time did all he could to bring about vital role in the peace in Northern Ireland.

Munce trained for the Methodist Ministry at Edgehill Theological College.  He has been an active facilitator of anti-sectarianism, community relations and reconciliation over several decades. In South Londonderry he pioneered cross community projects, and was  invited to speak on  these to the House of Lords. Later in the north of the city he worked with homeless men and disadvantaged families. He was also in North Belfast during times of extreme sectarian violence and chaired several committees aimed at getting people into work and living harmoniously together. He also travelled across the world to set up projects for refugee communities on four continents. In 2003 he was awarded an Honorary Doctorate by the University of Ulster.

References

1948 births
Irish Methodist ministers
Alumni of Edgehill Theological College
People associated with Ulster University
People of The Troubles (Northern Ireland)
Living people